Zsófia Kovács may refer to:
Zsófia Kovács (triathlete) (born 1988), Hungarian triathlete
Zsófia Kovács (gymnast) (born 2000), Hungarian gymnast